The 1999 SpeedVision World Challenge was the tenth running of the Sports Car Club of America's premier series. It was the first season that the series would be covered by the SpeedVision network. The season also marked a new format, with Touring 1 becoming Grand Touring and Touring 2 becoming Touring Car. 1999 was also the first year in which the series would have a corporate sponsor since 1991. Pontiac got its final series win this season, joining Oldsmobile and Saturn as General Motors brands gradually disappearing from the World Challenge. It was not until the rise of the Cadillac CTS-V that a GM division other than Chevrolet would see a win. This also led to the beginning of a longtime BMW-Mazda-Acura affair in touring car.

Results

References

GT World Challenge America